Ken "Kenny" Vadas (born July 25, 1981) is a Canadian actor best known for his role in The Santa Clause and several television shows.

Career 
Vadas began his career by acting in several commercials. He was a regular on the Eric's World and had guest roles on Are You Afraid of the Dark?, Goosebumps, and The Adventures of Sinbad.

He acted in several made-for-television movies and appeared as the E.L.F.S. Leader in the Disney Christmas film The Santa Clause.

Vadas also played the lead role of Harvey Cheyne in the television remake of Captains Courageous starring Robert Urich. Vadas received a Family Film Award nomination and won a Young Artist Award.

Vadas appeared as Prince Cosimo in the HBO television movie, Galileo: On The Shoulders of Giants, which he co-starred Michael Moriarty.

Filmography

References

Canadian male child actors
Canadian male film actors
Canadian male television actors
Canadian people of Hungarian descent
Living people
Male actors from Montreal
1981 births